Tatum Lynn is a singer-songwriter from Arizona. Her music has pop and R&B influences. She is the founder of the non-profit Music as Therapy, a nonprofit dedicated to providing music therapy and instruments to kids in special-education classrooms throughout Arizona.

Biography 
Lynn released two singles in advance of her debut album. First, "Now U See Me, Now U Don't" and then "Later Baby, XO," which reached number 35 on the Billboard Adult Top 40. In November 2020, she released the single "Let Down Your Hair." Its music video was directed and choreographed by Benji Schwimmer. On March 5, 2021, her debut album, also called Let Down Your Hair, was released. It includes contributions from producer/songwriters Jon Levine, Lauren Christy, John Fields, Andrew Wells, Stephan Moccio. In addition to pop fare, the album touches on heavier topics like teen-suicide rates and depression. In an interview with American Songwriter, Lynn stated, "I hope when people hear my album, they know that I’m just like them. I go through my good days and bad days." With her album debut, she released a second single, titled "With Me." She told Parade that she hoped the  "song will help someone suffering and give them a voice."

In March 2021, Lynn covered Paramore's "Still Into You," and put a video of her live performance on her YouTube channel.

Music videos

References 

Living people
2000 births
American singer-songwriters